Anthony Charles Beilenson (October 26, 1932 – March 5, 2017) was an American lawyer and politician who served as a Democratic Congressman from Southern California. He served ten terms in the United States House of Representatives from 1977 until 1997.

Early life and education 
Beilenson was born in New Rochelle, New York, and grew up in an upscale suburb of New York City. He attended Harvard University, where he earned BA (1954) and JD (1957) degrees. Beilenson then relocated to Los Angeles and became a partner in a Beverly Hills law firm which represented the film industry.

Political career 

Beilenson was elected to the California State Assembly in 1963, serving until 1967, and then served in the California State Senate from 1967 to 1976. Among his accomplishments in the California State Legislature was winning enactment of the "Beilenson Act", which requires public hearings whenever hospitals in California are closed or reduce services. His most noteworthy accomplishment was as author of the 1967 Therapeutic Abortion Act, one of the most liberal abortion laws at that time, which legalized abortion when a woman’s mental or physical health was at risk or if pregnancy resulted from rape or incest.

In 1968 Beilenson was an unsuccessful candidate for the Democratic nomination for the U.S. Senate, losing to Alan Cranston.

Beilenson was then elected to and served ten terms in the U.S. House of Representatives in the United States Congress, beginning in 1977, until his retirement in 1997. While in Congress, he served on the House Rules Committee, and as Chairman of the Permanent Select Committee on Intelligence, 1989–1991.

Beilenson was a member of the ReFormers Caucus of Issue One.

Tributes 

In 1998, in tribute to his long career of community and government service to California, Lake Balboa Park, in Van Nuys was renamed the "Anthony C. Beilenson Park". The park, which is located along Balboa Boulevard in Van Nuys, is an  water recreation facility, with Balboa Lake at its center, and containing a universally accessible playground. The  artificial lake is supplied with reclaimed water from the Donald C. Tillman Water Reclamation Plant.

He and his wife Dolores were also honored by the Jewish National Fund, San Fernando Valley Region, in 1991, for Congressman Beilenson's career of service as a public official, and for Dolores Beilenson's service as co-chair of the Congressional Wives for Soviet Jewry.

Beilenson died at his home in the Westwood neighborhood of Los Angeles on March 5, 2017, after suffering a heart attack.  He was 84.

See also
 List of Jewish members of the United States Congress

References

External links
.

Join California Anthony C. Beilenson

|-

|-

|-

|-

|-

American environmentalists
Democratic Party members of the United States House of Representatives from California
Politicians from Los Angeles
1932 births
2017 deaths
California lawyers
Democratic Party California state senators
Democratic Party members of the California State Assembly
Harvard Law School alumni
Politicians from New Rochelle, New York
Santa Monica Mountains National Recreation Area
Jewish members of the United States House of Representatives
Activists from New Rochelle, New York
Activists from California
People from Westwood, Los Angeles
20th-century American lawyers
20th-century American politicians
21st-century American Jews
New Rochelle High School alumni